Frank William Taussig (1859–1940) was an American economist who is credited with creating the foundations of modern trade theory.

Early life

He was born on December 28, 1859, in St. Louis, Missouri, the son of William Taussig and Adele Wuerpel.  His parents encouraged his literary and musical interests, and he played the violin at an early age. He was educated in the St. Louis public schools and at Smith Academy in that same city. He then went to Washington University in St. Louis but, after a year transferred to Harvard from where he graduated in 1879.

He traveled in Europe for a year, taking some time to study economics at the University of Berlin. He then did graduate work at Harvard in law and economics while he was secretary to President Charles W. Eliot for some years.

Teaching
He got a law degree in 1886 and was appointed assistant professor at Harvard. He became professor of economics in 1892, and he remained at Harvard for the balance of his professional career except for several years spent in federal service and some time spent traveling in Europe recovering from a nervous disorder.

Beliefs
Taussig was an open advocate of forced sterilization of races and classes he considered inferior. In his 1911 textbook Principles of Economics, Taussing remarked: 

Paul Douglas (a future president of the American Economic Association and three-term Senator from Illinois) was a graduate student under Taussig at Harvard in the Fall of 1915 and recalled the experience. Douglas had studied two years in graduate school at Columbia University with Edwin Seligman, who was an ideological enemy of Taussig. Given the opportunity to criticize the Columbia school of economic thought by confronting Douglas, Taussig attempted to humiliate him to the delight of the Harvard pupils who filled the lecture hall to witness the "slaughter". Eventually, Douglas turned the tables and trapped Taussig in a logical economic debate. Douglas recalled, "The following day, Taussig cordially shook hands with me at the end of the hour. ... We also became fast friends for the rest of his life. Trying as the experience was, it was the best thing to happen to me in my academic life. It forced me to master the reasoning of the great economic theorists and to stand my ground under verbal and logical bombardment."

Beet sugar and tariff
In a 1912 article in The Quarterly Journal of Economics, Taussig favored protecting the beet sugar industry with a tariff on sugar imports. A beet sugar industry gives intangible benefits by adding to the versatility and capabilities of American agriculture. Unskilled labor gains employment in the labor-intensive beet sugar sector of agriculture. Beet sugar grows best in cool climates of the irrigated regions of Colorado, Utah, Idaho, Montana, and California.

Other positions held
He was the editor of the Quarterly Journal of Economics from 1889 to 1890 and from 1896 to 1935, president of the American Economic Association in 1904 and 1905, and chair of the United States Tariff Commission from 1917 to 1919.

In March 1919, he was called to Paris to advise in the adjustment of commercial treaties, and in November, on invitation of Woodrow Wilson, he attended the second industrial conference in Washington, DC, for promoting peace between capital and labour. He was a strong supporter of the League of Nations.

Death
He died on November 11, 1940, aged 80, in Cambridge, Massachusetts. Taussig is buried in Mount Auburn Cemetery in Cambridge.

Legacy
The successor to his chair at Harvard was Joseph Schumpeter. In 1888, he married Edith Thomas Guild.  One of their four children was Helen B. Taussig (1898–1986), a noted pediatrician and cardiologist.  F. W. Taussig's first wife died in 1910, and he married Laura Fisher.

Works

Much of Taussigs work is available from Internet Archive:
 1883: Protection to Young Industries as Applied to the United States (second edition, 1886)
 1885: History of the Present Tariff, 1860–83
 1888: The Tariff History of the United States eighth edition, 1931,
 1892: The Silver Situation in the United States (second edition, revised, 1896)
 1896: Wages and Capital
 1911, 1915, 1927 Principles of Economics, volume 1, Volume 2
 1918: Some Aspects of the Tariff Question
 1915: Inventors and Money Makers, Brown University lectures
 1920: Free Trade, the Tariff, and Reciprocity
 1927: International Trade
 1887–1935: Economic theory exam questions

References

Sources
 Britannica Online
 Profile of Frank W. Taussig at the History of Economic Thought website.
 Department of Economics, University of Victoria
 
 

1859 births
1940 deaths
American economics writers
American eugenicists
American male non-fiction writers
American political writers
American social scientists
Harvard University faculty
Writers from St. Louis
Burials at Mount Auburn Cemetery
International Trade Commission personnel
Presidents of the American Economic Association
Economists from Missouri
Corresponding Fellows of the British Academy
Washington University in St. Louis alumni
Harvard College alumni